Jacob Levin (also known as Jacob Lewin; 22 November 1890 – 10 December 1945) was a Swedish amateur football player who competed in the 1912 Summer Olympics. He played as defender in one match of the main tournament against the Netherlands. In 1913, he joined Everton F.C., he played in two games for the Liverpool-based club in "A" team games against West Lancashire Football League team Southport Park Villa and Marine F.C.

External links
 Swedish squad in 1912

References 

1890 births
1945 deaths
Swedish footballers
Sweden international footballers
Örgryte IS players
Everton F.C. players
Olympic footballers of Sweden
Footballers at the 1912 Summer Olympics
Association football defenders
Swedish expatriate footballers
Swedish expatriate sportspeople in England